Suraj Nandan Kushwaha was an Indian politician from Bharatiya Janata Party, Bihar who served as the member of Bihar Legislative Council from 2014 till his death in 2018. He had served as the General Secretary of the Bharatiya Janata Party, Bihar. He also served as the National President of the Rashtrawadi Kushwaha Parishad.

Life and political career 
Kushwaha was the president of an organisation called "Rashtravadi Kushwaha Parishad", which was working for the identification of Koeri caste with the Mauryan Emperors. He organised several programs to support this claim, which was also supported by Bhartiya Janata Party. Earlier, he used to carry "Mehta" surname, but latter chose "Kushwaha" as the surname to make his identity more specific to the Koeri or Kushwaha caste.
Kushwaha passed away on 28 December 2018 late night after a cardiac arrest.

References 

1957 births
2018 deaths
Bharatiya Janata Party politicians from Bihar
Members of the Bihar Legislative Council